Collector's Item may refer to:

Collectable, an item that is collected
Collector's Item (Apo Hiking Society album)
Collector's Item (Twelfth Night album)
Collector's Item (EP), an EP by King Diamond
Collectors' Item: All Their Greatest Hits!, album by Harold Melvin and the Blue Notes
Collector's Item (Babes in Toyland album), an album by Babes in Toyland
Collector's Item (1958 TV series), a TV series that was not picked up.  The pilot, "The Left Fist of David" was directed by Buzz Kulik
The Trap (1985 film) (La gabbia), an Italian film also known as Collector's Item
Collector's Item (play), a 1952 Broadway play featuring Erik Rhodes

See also
Collectors' Items, album by Miles Davis